4 is the fourth studio album by American singer Beyoncé. It was released on June 24, 2011, by Parkwood Entertainment and Columbia Records. Following a career hiatus that reignited her creativity, Beyoncé was inspired to create a record with a basis in traditional rhythm and blues that stood apart from contemporary popular music. Her collaborations with songwriters and record producers The-Dream, Tricky Stewart and Shea Taylor produced a mellower tone, developing diverse vocal styles and influences from funk, hip hop, and soul music.

Severing professional ties with father and manager Mathew Knowles, Beyoncé eschewed the music of her previous releases in favor of an intimate, personal album. 4s lyrics emphasize monogamy, female empowerment and self-reflection, a result of Beyoncé considering a maturer message to contend artistic credibility. In May 2011, Beyoncé submitted seventy-two songs to Columbia Records for consideration, twelve of which appeared on the standard edition.

4 was promoted in mid-2011 by television performances and festival appearances, such as Beyoncé's headlining Glastonbury Festival set. The album received generally positive reviews by music critics; several publications included it on their year-end lists. It was her fourth consecutive album to debut at number one on the US Billboard 200, and it also reached number one in Brazil, Ireland, South Korea, Spain, Switzerland and the United Kingdom. 4 spawned the international singles "Run the World (Girls)", "Best Thing I Never Had", "Party", "Love On Top" and "Countdown". "Love On Top" won the Grammy Award for Best Traditional R&B Performance at the 55th annual ceremony. As of November 2016, 4 had sold 5 million copies worldwide.

Background and development 
Following the release of her third album I Am... Sasha Fierce (2008) and a world tour, Beyoncé took a career hiatus in 2010 "to live life [and] to be inspired by things again". During her hiatus, she "killed" Sasha Fierce, the alter-ego used in her previous studio album, as she felt she could now merge her two personalities. She severed professional ties with father and manager Mathew Knowles, who had guided her career since the 1990s with Destiny's Child, noting that the decision made her feel vulnerable.

In an interview for Complex, Beyoncé expressed dissatisfaction with contemporary radio. She intended 4 to help change that status, commenting, "Figuring out a way to get R&B back on the radio is challenging ... With 4, I tried to mix R&B from the '70s and the '90s with rock 'n' roll and a lot of horns to create something new and exciting. I wanted musical changes, bridges, vibrata, live instrumentation and classic songwriting." On her website she wrote, "The album is definitely an evolution. It's bolder than the music on my previous albums because I'm bolder. The more mature I become and the more life experiences I have, the more I have to talk about. I really focused on songs being classics, songs that would last, songs that I could sing when I'm 40 and when I'm 60." Beyoncé also sought to make more artistic music, rather than purely commercially oriented songs.

Although much of 4s inspiration came from "touring, travelling, watching rock bands and attending festivals", the album's early musical direction was influenced by Nigerian Afrobeat musician Fela Kuti, whose passion for music motivated Beyoncé. She worked with the band from Fela!, the Broadway musical based on Kuti's life. DJ Swivel, one of 4s engineers, later described how Kuti's use of percussion and horns influenced the track "End of Time". In 2015, The-Dream revealed that he and Beyoncé had composed a whole album based on Kuti's music, although this was scrapped in favor of creating 4, therefore explaining how "End of Time" became so heavily influenced.

She also found additional influences in Earth, Wind & Fire, The Stylistics, Lauryn Hill, Stevie Wonder, and Michael Jackson. She used hip hop for a "broader sound" and looked to bring soul singing back, stating, "I used a lot of the brassiness and grittiness in my voice that people hear in my live performances, but not necessarily on my records."

Recording and production 

Three months into her hiatus in March 2010, Beyoncé began recording at her husband Jay-Z's Roc the Mic Studios in New York City. One song—"Party"—was recorded because she wanted to see what working relationship would develop with engineer DJ Swivel. Kanye West assisted the production of "Party" after Beyoncé was impressed by his work on My Beautiful Dark Twisted Fantasy (2010). André 3000, the only featured artist on 4, contributed a rap verse to the song, which he recorded in Georgia.

Six weeks later, in May 2010, she asked Swivel to work on the entire project. Concerning his working relationship with Beyoncé, he commented, "There was no 'We're doing this today.' It was a very kind of open project, where whatever she felt like recording at that time was what we'd work on. It was based on how she felt, her mood, and also her listening to the demos that writers would give us." With Swivel, she experimented with horns, drums, guitars and percussion instruments. Mostly inspired by the Fela! sessions, Swivel began to formulate beats using their own recordings and those from Fela! The project was moved to KMA Studios for a week and a half because Roc the Mic was not large enough. There they began recording "I Care", "Best Thing I Never Had" and "Rather Die Young", and completed "Party". They recorded the songs "Schoolin' Life", "1+1" and "Start Over" at Jungle City Studios in New York.

MSR Studios was the final New York City-based studio used, and where most of 4 was recorded—only "Party" and "I Was Here" were recorded entirely at other studios. At MSR, Beyoncé emphasized the use of live instruments on songs such as "I Care" and "End of Time". Consequently, most of the instruments, including drums, keyboards, guitar and bass work, were recorded there and performed by Jeff Bhasker and Shea Taylor. Beyoncé asked Frank Ocean to write and record "I Miss You" at MSR, saying to Complex, "[Jay-Z] had a CD playing in the car one Sunday when we were driving to Brooklyn. I noticed his tone, his arrangements, and his storytelling. I immediately reached out to him—literally the next morning. I asked him to fly to New York and work on my record."

After listening to each song, Beyoncé would often request the addition of specific instruments, leaving her production team to make the sounds cohesive. Her vocals were recorded through an Avalon Design 737 preamp and compressed in a 1176 Peak Limiter with a 4:1 ratio. After recording the lead vocals for a track, Swivel cut them in different ways and he and Beyoncé picked the best, then recording the backing vocals. Beyoncé composed her own vocal arrangements and harmonies for each song. Her microphones were carefully placed to achieve a blend of sounds with a clear quality. Swivel spoke of her work ethic in an interview for Sound on Sound:

After the move to MSR, Beyoncé and her production team began travelling. In the United Kingdom, they worked at Peter Gabriel's Real World Studios in Wiltshire—particularly using Gabriel's multi-instrument room—to create "Love On Top". Soon after, Beyoncé joined Jay-Z in a Sydney mansion, as he was working on his collaboration album Watch the Throne (2011) with Kanye West. There they created a "primitive studio" using a microphone, a rig out and Pro Tools software to record. Sessions were also held in Las Vegas, Los Angeles, Atlanta and Honolulu.

In February 2011, MTV reported the project was nearing completion. 4 was mixed mostly at MixStar Studios in Virginia and mastered at Sterling Sound in New York City. The audio mastering was delayed by a week following the unexpected recording of "I Was Here". Diane Warren had played the song to Jay-Z during a telephone conversation, leading him to put Warren and Beyoncé in contact. In May 2011, Beyoncé submitted seventy-two songs in preparation for the album's release. According to Swivel, an eclectic range of songs were recorded, including ballads, "weird ethereal things" and 1990s R&B and Afrobeat-inspired songs.

Music and lyrics 

The final cut of 4 comprises twelve tracks on the standard edition and eighteen on the deluxe edition—three of which are remixes of "Run the World (Girls)". Critics viewed 4 as a major departure from Beyoncé's previous catalogue, with a distinctive mellower sound. The album consists mostly of mid-tempo R&B songs, with 1970s funk, 1980s pop and 1990s soul influences. The second half was more eclectic, exploring a variety of genres including hard rock, reggae and adult contemporary. The Guardian complimented the album's divergence from the "layering [of] Euro-synths on pop-step woomphs" that characterize the music of Beyoncé's contemporaries.

The balladry of the first half of 4 combines diverse vocal styles with the use of live instrumentation. "1+1" demonstrates Beyoncé's vocal-flexing over "magnificent guitar bombast" and a soft backing beat, while "Start Over", a mid tempo R&B ballad, uses a futuristic beat with electric elements and synthesizers. "I Miss You", with its "layers of atmospheric keyboards", ambient synthesizers and tinny 808 drums was sung in a half-whisper to exhibit intense emotion. "I Was Here", an understated pop-R&B ballad with indie rock inflections, primarily concerns self-reflection with dramatic vocals.

On other songs, Beyoncé explores womanhood. "Best Thing I Never Had", 4s fourth track, was described as a moment of self-realization and a "female call to arms". With vocals that allude to a "wounded bird turned resilient lioness", the song is built on a "winkly piano riff and beefy bass drums". "Dance for You" conveys a more sexual tone through breathy vocals and blaring electric guitars. It forgoes her typical empowerment themes in favor of sensual imagery and comfort with one's partner. "Run the World (Girls)", a female empowerment anthem reminiscent of Beyoncé's more contemporary work on I Am... Sasha Fierce, uses an energetic sample of Major Lazer's "Pon de Floor". The song incorporates "layered melodics", most prominently a military marching drumbeat, while Beyoncé's near-chanted delivery encompasses her full vocal range.

The tracks "Countdown" and "End of Time" were distinguished by their musical and lyrical experimentalism. "Countdown" was described as "everywhere on the genre map", although predominantly dancehall-led with a "bristling brass arrangement". Its chorus describes a relationship by counting backwards from ten, using a sample from Boyz II Men's "Uhh Ahh". "End of Time"s pulsating, brass sound—reminiscent of a marching-band—was heavily influenced by Afrobeat musician Fela Kuti. Kuti's use of horns and percussion instruments was recreated and combined with elements of electronic music and synthesizers. "Lay Up Under Me" is also built on retro horns, featuring upbeat vocals, a sound Ryan Dombal of Pitchfork associated with Michael Jackson's 1979 album Off the Wall.

Other tracks were noted for their retro stylization. "Rather Die Young" is a throwback to 1960s doo-wop and Philadelphia soul, with a slow tempo and modern drums. "Party" achieves a vintage aesthetic through minimalistic production, replete with heavy synthesizers and a 1980s smooth-funk groove. The song is unique for its conversation-like structure, in which Beyoncé and guest-vocalist André 3000 sing verses that allude to socialization at parties. Elements of Prince's style was found on "Schoolin' Life" and "1+1". "Schoolin' Life" is an uptempo funk song, with lyrics that advise the listener to live life to the fullest while cautioning them about the consequences of excess. The chorus of "1+1" was compared to "Purple Rain", with themes of sadness and resentment, the song uses soft background vocals and dense percussion. "Love On Top" was noted for its energetic key changes with a joyful tone, evoking the work of Michael and Janet Jackson. Its retro sound is marked by a melding of horns as well as sweet backing harmonies that are most prominent on its bridge and chorus.

Release and promotion 
In an interview for Billboard, Beyoncé stated that despite having another concept for the album, she was ultimately influenced by her fans to name the album 4. She described the number four as being "special" to her, as her and Jay-Z's birthdays, several other family and friends' birthdays, and her wedding anniversary fall on the fourth day of the month. The cover of the standard edition was revealed on Beyoncé's website on May 18, 2011. Shot on the rooftop of the Hôtel Meurice in Paris, Beyoncé is looking into the distance with her arms raised over her head, wearing smokey eye makeup, thick gold cuffs and a fox-fur stole by cult French designer Alexandre Vauthier, embellished with Swarovski crystals by the Lesage embroidery house. The cover of the deluxe edition was shown on June 16, where Beyoncé is dressed in a tight-fitting blue-purple dress by French designer Maxime Simoens, holding her hands in her hair. For its artwork, she opted for clothing made by lesser-known designers. The promotional and interior-package images for 4 were shot at the same time.

On May 18, 2011, 4s release date in the United States was confirmed on to be June 28. On June 7, the album was leaked onto the Internet in full; Beyoncé's legal representatives issued warnings to infringing websites and leaked tracks were soon removed from such sites. On June 9, Beyoncé responded to the leak through Facebook, commenting, "My music was leaked and while this is not how I wanted to present my new songs, I appreciate the positive response from my fans. When I record music I always think about my fans singing every note and dancing to every beat. I make music to make people happy and I appreciate that everyone has been so anxious to hear my new songs." Following this, reports circulated that Columbia Records executives hoped to cover their assets in fear that the album may be a commercial failure. Rumors had suggested that the label requested from Beyoncé to make changes to the record and reunite Destiny's Child, claims Columbia denied. In August 2013, NME reported that Sony Music were suing a 47-year-old man from Gothenburg for US$233,000 concerning the leak of 4. The deluxe version was released simultaneously with the standard edition in several countries. In the United States, it was available exclusively through Target stores.

Beyoncé made several appearances on television and in live shows to promote 4. She performed "Run the World (Girls)" for the first time on May 17, 2011, on Surprise Oprah! A Farewell Spectacular at the United Center in Chicago. She also performed the song at the 2011 Billboard Music Awards. On May 25, "1+1" was made available for download through the iTunes Store in the United States. The same day, "1+1" was performed at the American Idol final; she introduced it as her favorite song. In June, she performed at the Palais Nikaia in Nice, Zénith de Lille, and the Galaxie in Amnéville. On June 26, Beyoncé was the closing act at the Glastonbury Festival 2011 in the United Kingdom. She was the first solo female artist to headline the Pyramid stage at the Glastonbury Festival in more than twenty years. A pre-taped performance of "Best Thing I Never Had" and "End of Time" at the Glastonbury Festival was broadcast during the 2011 BET Awards. The following day, Beyoncé's exclusive hour-long interview with Piers Morgan in London was broadcast on Piers Morgan Tonight. She also appeared on the finale of France's X Factor to perform "Run the World" and "Best Thing I Never Had". An MTV television special, Beyoncé: Year of 4, premiered on June 30, documenting Beyoncé's life during 4s production.

On July 1, Beyoncé appeared on Good Morning America as part of its "Summer Concert Series" in New York City. She also projected images from 4 on a number of London's landmarks, including Madame Tussauds and Battersea Power Station. She then traveled to Scotland to perform at the T in the Park Festival on July 9, 2011. The next day, she performed at the Oxegen Festival in Ireland. On July 28, 2011, Beyoncé performed "1+1" and "Best Thing I Never Had" on The View; the latter was also performed on Late Night with Jimmy Fallon the same day. From August 16–19, Beyoncé held the 4 Intimate Nights with Beyoncé concerts at the Roseland Ballroom to a standing room only audience. Subsequently, the Live at Roseland: Elements of 4 DVD was released in November. "Love On Top" was sung at the 2011 MTV Video Music Awards on August 28, Beyoncé finished the performance by unbuttoning her blazer and rubbing her stomach to confirm her pregnancy. A live performance of "Countdown" recorded in July was broadcast on Late Night with Jimmy Fallon in November.

Singles 
4 was Beyoncé' first album that yielded no number-one singles in the United States, as no song from 4 reached the top ten on the Billboard Hot 100. "Run the World (Girls)" was released internationally as the lead single from 4 on April 21, 2011. It reached number twenty-nine on the Billboard Hot 100 chart and number eleven on the UK Singles Chart. "Best Thing I Never Had" followed on June 1, 2011. It fared much better on national charts, reaching number sixteen in the United States, number five in New Zealand and number three in the United Kingdom.

"Party" was released as an urban contemporary single in the United States on August 30, 2011; its remix, featuring J. Cole, was released in the United States, Canada and some European countries on October 24, 2011. "Love On Top" was released in Australia as a contemporary hit radio single in September 2011; it was released in Italy, Belgium and the United States later. It topped the US Billboard Hot R&B/Hip-Hop Songs for seven consecutive weeks. "Countdown" was released in the United States and parts of Europe, beginning October 4, 2011. "I Care" was released exclusively in Italy on March 23, 2012. "End of Time" was released exclusively in the United Kingdom on April 23, 2012.

Critical reception 

4 received positive reviews from music critics. At Metacritic, which assigns a weighted mean rating out of 100 to reviews from mainstream critics, the album received an average score of 73, based on 36 reviews. Michael Cragg of The Observer called it Beyoncé's "most accomplished album yet". Slant Magazines Eric Henderson believed 4 succeeds vocally as an album of mostly intimate and slow-tempo ballads. Mikael Wood of Spin magazine applauded its ballads, mid-tempo songs, and evocations of late 1970s and early 1980s pop-soul. In his review for Rolling Stone, Jody Rosen wrote that Beyoncé eschews contemporary production styles for a more personal and idiosyncratic album. Jon Caramanica of The New York Times viewed it as a good showcase for Beyoncé as a torch singer, because she convincingly sings about heartbreak and the strong emotional effect of love. Pitchfork critic Ryan Dombal found it easygoing, retro-informed, and engaging because it shows "one of the world's biggest stars exploring her talent in ways few could've predicted". AllMusic's Andy Kellman said that the quality of Beyoncé's singing and the songwriting compensate for the assorted arrangement of the songs. Uncut viewed it is an exceptional album in spite of occasionally trite lyrics.

In a less enthusiastic review, Adam Markovitz of Entertainment Weekly said the first half of 4 is marred by boring ballads and the songwriting in general are not on-par with Beyoncé's vocal talent. In his review for The Guardian, Alexis Petridis was ambivalent towards the album's 1980s influence and argued that, despite well written songs, it is not very consequential. Time magazine's Claire Suddath said the songs lack lyrical substance, even though they are performed well. Greg Kot, writing in the Chicago Tribune, called 4 inconsistent, short, and unfinished. NME magazine's Hamish MacBain felt Beyoncé did not progress from her past work and that "even the OK bits here" sounded "uninspired". Tom Hull was more critical and gave the album a "C", lamenting the second half of songs' "overkill production" and believing the first half's ballads show that, while "every soul diva of her generation has dreamed of singing like Aretha Franklin ... only Beyoncé has had the ego to think she's done it."

Accolades 
4 was included on various publication's year-end lists. It was ranked as the best album of the year by The New Yorker, and came in the runner-up spot on lists produced by Spin and Amazon. The album was ranked within the top 10 by MSN, where it came in at number three, The Guardian and MTV, which placed it at number four, and the Chicago Sun-Times, which placed it at number six. The BBC ranked it at number seven, while The New York Times listed it as the 10th best album of the year. The album had strong showings on other lists, where it was placed number 13 by Consequence of Sound, number 18 by Stereogum, number 25 by Rolling Stone, number 39 by Spin, number 10 by Club Fonograma, number 34 by Pretty Much Amazing and number 27 by Pitchfork. 4 was included in NPR's Top 50 Favorite Albums of 2011, and was ranked at number 26 in the Pazz & Jops critics poll.

It was listed at 37 on Rolling Stones Women Who Rock: 50 Greatest Albums of All Time. Pitchfork ranked the album at 39 on their list of the Top 100 Best Albums of the decade thus far, with Kyle Kramer writing that 4 "avoided the trappings of safe, later-career bids, instead setting up the perfect platform for Beyoncé as the pop star, a queen for all the people." The album was included on Consequence of Sound's list of The 10 Best Summer Albums of All Time with Kenneth Partridge writing that "whether she's hopelessly heartbroken or crazy in love, Queen Bey works damn hard to make you feel exactly what she's feeling".

4 was named the greatest R&B album of the decade (2010s) by Rated R&B, and the second greatest pop album of the decade by Uproxx. On their ranking of the 200 best albums of the decade, Pitchfork listed 4 at number 31. For BrooklynVegan, it was the 29th best R&B/Rap project of the same period.

4 won R&B Album of the Year at the 2012 Billboard Music Awards and received nominations at the 2011 American Music Awards, the 2011 Soul Train Music Awards, the 38th People's Choice Awards, the 43rd NAACP Image Awards and the 2012 Grammis. At the 55th Annual Grammy Awards, "Love On Top" won the Best Traditional R&B Performance Award.

 Commercial performance 
In the United States, 4 debuted at number one on the Billboard 200, with first-week sales of 310,000 copies. This gave Beyoncé her fourth consecutive solo album to debut at number one on the Billboard 200 album chart, making her the second female artist, after Britney Spears, and third artist overall, tied with Spears and DMX to have her first four studio albums debut atop the Billboard 200. 4s first-week sales became Beyoncé's lowest sales start with a studio album to date. Keith Caulfield of Billboard magazine noted that the album was not released during the festive season and that Beyoncé was so far lacking a hit single, which could help explain the album's softer entry. It marks the third-largest sales week of the year, after the number-one bows of Lady Gaga's Born This Way and Adele's 21. 4 became the ninth numerically titled album to top the chart since 1956. In its second week, the album remained at number one on the Billboard 200, despite a 63% sales decrease, selling 115,000 copies. It hence became the first album by Beyoncé to top the Billboard 200 albums chart for more than one week; an effort succeeded by her self-titled fifth studio album (2013) that remained there for three weeks. On August 1, 2011, the album was certified platinum by the Recording Industry Association of America (RIAA), having shipped one million copies to retail stores. As of December 2015, it had reached sales of 1.5 million copies in the United States. As of November 2016, it had sold over 5 million copies worldwide. As of August 2022, the album is certified four-times platinum.
On its first day of release, 4 sold around 20,000 copies in the United Kingdom. According to the Official Charts Company data, this was more than the combined sales of its three nearest challengers: Adele's 19 (2008) and 21 (2011) and Lady Gaga's Born This Way (2011). After a week of sales, 4 debuted atop the UK Albums Chart on July 4, 2011, with first-week sales of 89,211 copies, staying there for a second week with sales of 44,929 copies. By May 2013, it had sold 603,548 copies in the United Kingdom. 4 opened at number two on the Australian ARIA Charts, giving Beyoncé her highest chart debut there. 4 debuted at number three on the Canadian Albums Chart, selling 8,700 copies in its first week. It debuted at number two in France, selling 12,393 copies in its first week. According to the Japanese music charting site Oricon, the album debuted at number ten, selling 18,984 copies for the week ending July 11, 2011.

 Track listing 

 Notes 

  signifies a co-producer
  signifies an additional producer
  signifies a vocal producer
  signifies a remixer
 "I Care" features background vocals by Billy Kraven
 "Party" features background vocals by Kanye West and Consequence
 "Rather Die Young" features background vocals by Luke Steele and Billy Kraven
 "I Was Here" features background vocals by Ryan Tedder
 The deluxe edition contains an exclusive version of the music video for "Run the World (Girls)".
"Party" contains a sample of "La Di Da Di" as performed by Doug E. Fresh and the Get Fresh Crew featuring MC Ricky D. and written by Douglas Davis and Ricky Walters.
"Countdown" contains a sample of "Uhh Ahh" as performed by Boyz II Men and written by Michael Bivins, Nathan Morris and Wanya Morris.
"End of Time" contains an uncredited sample of "BTSTU" as performed and written by Jai Paul.
"Run the World (Girls)" contains a sample "Pon de Floor" as performed by Major Lazer and written by Afrojack, Vybz Cartel, Diplo and Switch.

 Personnel 
Credits adapted from the liner notes of 4.Performance creditsBeyoncé – vocals, background vocals
André 3000 – vocals, background vocals
Luke Steele – background vocals
Kanye West – background vocals
Consequence – background vocals
Ryan Tedder – background vocals
Billy Kraven – background vocalsVisuals and imageryTony Duran – photography
Neal Farinah – glam team
Greg Gex – photography
Ty Hunter – fashion director
Kimberly Kimble – glam team
Lisa Logan – glam team
Adam Larson – art director
Melina Matsoukas – creative consultant
Raquel Smith – stylist
Jenke Ahmed Taily – creative director
Francesca Tolot – glam team
Ellen Von Unwerth – photographyInstrumentsPete Wolford – guitar
Nikki Glaspie – drums
Lee Blaske – strings
Drew Sayers – baritone, tenor
Chad Hugo – rhythm guitar
Kanye West – drums, keyboards, programming
Jeff Bhasker – keyboard, guitar solo, keyboards and drum programming
Rob Suchecki – guitar
Cole Kamen-Green – trumpet
Josiah Woodson – trumpet
Nick Videen – tenor, alto saxophone
Alex Asher – trombone
Morgan Price – baritone saxophone, tenor
Shea Taylor – alto saxophone, horns arrangement
Luke Steele – guitar
Robert "R.T." Taylor – guitar
Pat Thrall – guitar
Johnny Butler – tenor saxophone
Jack Daley – bass guitar
Ryan Tedder – drums, piano, additional programming
Brent Kutzle – cello, guitar, additional programming
Skyz Muzik – drums, piano, additional programmingTechnical and production'

The-Dream – production
Tricky Stewart – production
Beyoncé – production, vocal production
Jeff Bhasker – production
Shea Taylor – production
Babyface – production
Antonio Dixon – production
Symbolyc One – production
Caleb McCampbell – production
Kanye West – production
Luke Steele – production
Tom Coyne – mastering
Switch – production
Ryan Tedder – production
Brent Kutzle – production
Kuk Harrell – vocal production, vocal recording
Diplo – production
Carlos McKinney – production
Kaskade – mix, additional production
Jens Bergmark – mix production
Julian Napolitano – mix production
DJ Swivel – recording, vocal recording, mixing
Mark Gray – engineering assistant
Jason Sherwood – engineering assistant
Steven Dennis – engineering assistant
Pete Wolford – engineering assistant
Scott Barnett – engineering assistant
Tony Maserati – mixing
Val Brathwaite – mixing assistant
Ryan Kelly – engineering assistant
Serge Nudel – mixing assistant, engineering assistant
Gloria Kaba – engineering assistant
Şerban Ghenea – mixing
John Hanes – mixing engineer
Phil Seaford – mixing assistant
Gaylord Holomalia – engineering assistant
Christian Mochizuki – engineering assistant
Edwin Delahoz – engineering assistant
Justin Hergett – engineering assistant
Jon Castelli – engineering assistant
Ramón Rivas – engineering assistant
Chris Soper – engineering assistant
Smith Carlson – engineering assistant
Eric Aylands – engineering assistant
Jon Sher – engineering assistant

Charts

Weekly charts

Monthly charts

Year-end charts

Decade-end charts

All-time charts

Certifications

Release history

See also 
List of number-one albums of 2011 (Ireland)
List of number-one albums of 2011 (Spain)
List of number-one hits of 2011 (Switzerland)
List of UK Albums Chart number ones of the 2010s
List of UK R&B Albums Chart number ones of 2011
List of Billboard 200 number-one albums of 2011
List of Billboard number-one R&B albums of 2011

References

External links 
 

2011 albums
Beyoncé albums
Columbia Records albums
Albums produced by Diplo
Albums produced by Jeff Bhasker
Albums produced by Kanye West
Albums produced by Kuk Harrell
Albums produced by Switch (songwriter)
Albums produced by Symbolyc One
Albums produced by The-Dream
Albums with cover art by Tony Duran
Albums produced by Beyoncé
Albums recorded at Record Plant (Los Angeles)
Albums produced by Ryan Tedder